Rosina is a village and municipality in Žilina District in the Žilina Region of northern Slovakia. It has 900 houses with 3,200 people (2016). In 2003 there lived 2,888 people.

History
Unofficially the first mention is in year 1135 when there were 16 shacks and a priest Paulus Rosinaj was preaching Christianity as they were still heathens.

Another unofficial record is from 1208 along with a village Banova. Rosina then belonged under Strecno castle's domain until the year 1848 with exception of years 1685 – 1773 when it belonged to jesuits in Žilina.

In official historical records the village was first mentioned in 1341. (it is called Rozina, 1386 Rosna, 1416 Rossina, 1508 Rosyna, 1598 Rozzina, 1808 Rosyna; magyar Roszina, Harmatos)

First parsonage was built in 1514 and first wooden church in 1645 thanks to Ladislav Révai.

In 1598 there were 28 houses.

Geography
The municipality lies at an altitude of 400 metres and covers an area of 7.325 km2. It has a population of about 2,854 people.

Church of Saint Katherine of Alexandria

Church of Saint Katherine of Alexandria is a parish church in Rosina (small village near Žilina, Slovakia), built in 1776 in baroque style, and it is sacred to Saint Catherine of Alexandria. The church has one nave, it also has a sacristan and citadel with a roof in an onion-like shape. Its facade is articulated with allette. Inside is the main altar in the baroque style from the second half of the eighteenth century with a picture of Saint Katherine. Paintings inside are by Jozef Hanulla. After 1970, a new liturgical device was made. The old pulpit was removed as well as some of aisle small altars.

The church is adorned with several sculptures, for example Saint Karol Boromejský and Saint Jan Nepomucky on the main altar, and a sculpture of the Virgin Mary on the aisle altar.
Under the church there is a crypt, which has an entrance under the choir. It was opened around the year 1850. Beside work on new pavage this entrance was built up.

In front of church entrance there is a stone monument, as a memorial to the people who fell in World War II; their names are engraved on it. To the right of church there is a grave under lime, where former chaplain is buried. He acted in the village when cholera was spreading. 
From the year 2006 new Chapel of Virgin Mary of Lurdia is standing next to the church.

References

External links
http://www.rosina.sk
http://www.statistics.sk/mosmis/eng/run.html

Villages and municipalities in Žilina District